was a Japanese painter, calligrapher, and haiku poet. He originally trained in the Kanō style, under Kanō Yasunobu, but ultimately rejected that style and became a literati (bunjin). He was also known as Hishikawa Waō and by a number of other art-names.

Biography
Born in Kyoto and the son of a physician, he was originally named Taga Shinkō. He studied Kanō painting, but soon abandoned the school and his master to form his own style, which would come to be known as the Hanabusa school.

He was exiled in 1698, for parodying one of the shōgun's concubines in painting, to the island of Miyake-jima; he would not return until 1710. That year, in Edo, the artist would formally take the name Hanabusa Itchō.

Most of his paintings depicted typical urban life in Edo, and were approached from the perspective of a literati painter. His style, in-between the Kanō and ukiyo-e, is said to have been "more poetic and less formalistic than the Kanō school, and typical of the "bourgeois" spirit of the Genroku period".

Hanabusa was the master of the later painter Sawaki Suushi.

Hanabusa studied poetry under the master Matsuo Bashō, and is said to have been an excellent calligrapher as well.

His work is held in several institutions worldwide, including the Museum of Fine Arts Boston, the Philadelphia Museum of Art, the Los Angeles County Museum of Art, the Smithsonian Libraries, the Israel Museum , the Suntory Museum of Art, the Seattle Art Museum, the Museum of Cultural History Oslo, the University of Michigan Museum of Art, the Brooklyn Museum, the Minneapolis Institute of Art, the National Museum of Korea, and the British Museum.

See also
Hanabusa Itchō II – son and pupil of Itchō
nanga – "literati painting"

Notes

References
 Lane, Richard. (1978).  Images from the Floating World, The Japanese Print. Oxford: Oxford University Press. ;  OCLC 5246796

External links

Bridge of dreams: the Mary Griggs Burke collection of Japanese art, a catalog from The Metropolitan Museum of Art Libraries (fully available online as PDF), which contains material on Hanabusa Itchō (see index)
Short biography of Hanabusa Itcho - Jyuluck-Do Corporation

17th-century Japanese painters
17th-century Japanese poets
Ukiyo-e artists
1652 births
1724 deaths
Artists from Kyoto
Japanese writers of the Edo period
Writers from Kyoto
Japanese haiku poets
17th-century Japanese artists
18th-century Japanese artists
17th-century Japanese writers
18th-century Japanese writers
18th-century Japanese calligraphers
17th-century Japanese calligraphers
18th-century Japanese poets
18th-century Japanese painters